William Percy may refer to:

William de Percy (d.c. 1096/9), Anglo-Norman nobleman, crusader and founder of Whitby Abbey
William Percy (c.1337-1407), MP for Sussex
William Percy (bishop) (1428–1462), British bishop
William Percy (writer) (1574–1648), English poet and playwright
William Percy (portrait artist) (1820–1903), of Manchester, England
William Henry Percy (1788–1855), British naval officer
William Alexander Percy (politician), (1834–1888) American politician and grandfather of the below
William Alexander Percy (1885–1942), American lawyer, planter and poet
William Armstrong Percy III (born 1933), American historian and gay activist

See also
William Percy Carpmael (1864–1936), founder of The Barbarians football club
 Percy